Nathaniel Hartono Xiang, popularly known as Nathan Hartono (born 26 July 1991) is a Singaporean singer-songwriter and actor. Nathan made his debut as a singer after he won the Teenage Icon singing competition in 2005 and released his debut album, LET ME SING! Life, Love and All That Jazz in 2006. 

Nathan also ventured into acting and starred in his first television series, Halfworlds in 2015. As the first runner-up of the first season of Sing! China, as of January 2017 he also works with the committee to Promote Chinese Language Learning (CPCLL) to enrich the learning of the Chinese language among Singapore students. Hartono sang for Singapore's National Day Parade (NDP) theme song in 2020.

Early life
Hartono was born in Singapore on 26 July 1991 to Chinese Indonesian parents, Nathan's father, Thomas Hartono, is the managing director of PT Anandini Vimala, while his mother, Jocelyn Tjioe, is the senior vice president of Singapore-based Tung Lok group, which was founded by his grandfather. Nathan has an elder brother, Norman Hartono, and a younger sister, Nydia Hartono.

Hartono completed his primary school education at Nanyang Primary School and continued to Anglo-Chinese School (Barker Road) for his secondary education before graduating from Anglo-Chinese Junior College. In 2009, he was conscripted into the Singapore Armed Forces for national service. He subsequently studied at the Berklee College of Music majoring in Music Production & Engineering in Boston, and has taken a break from school since 2014.

Coming from an English-speaking family, Hartono struggled with learning the Chinese language in primary and secondary school, describing it as an "unclimbable mountain" in a 2017 interview. It was not until he entered junior college when he discovered his newfound interest in learning Chinese. In the same interview, he added that learning the language "could open up a lot of opportunities." After his stint at Sing! China, he could finally complete sentences in Mandarin without pausing or inserting English words. He has also spoken of how he is influenced by Frank Sinatra.

Career

2005-2009: Teenage Icon and music debut
After winning the  2005 Teenage Icon singing competition, Nathan made his debut as a singer in 2005 and released his first album, LET ME SING! Life, Love and All That Jazz, in 2006 which consisted of 11 tracks. The album charted as the number one album on HMV's Jazz Chart for two weeks after its release.

In 2007, Nathan performed at the Mosaic Music Festival and released his second album, Feeling Good with Nathan Hartono, which was recorded live during his sold-out shows in June the same year at the Esplanade. The album has a total of 12 tracks, with most of the songs covered by Nathan such as "Raindrops Keep Fallin' on My Head", "Everybody's Changing", "Moody's Mood for Love", "Seven Nation Army" during his concerts.

Nathan had also performed "Where I Belong" at Singapore's annual National Day Parade celebrations in 2008 and in 2009, he sang the theme song, Asia’s Youth, Our Future at the Asian Youth Games and also released a new album, Realise, which is a repackaged album of his first two albums. In that same year, he performed at Stephanie Sun's concert as a guest performer.

2010-2016: Nathan Hartono, Indonesia debut and Halfworlds
In 2011, Nathan made his debut in Indonesia under Aquarius Musikindo, and released his first single, Terlanjur Sayang. He also took part in Pangdemonium's production of the rock musical, Spring Awakening opposite Julia Abueva.

In 2012, Nathan was nominated for an ELLE Award 2012 for his performance. He released his first EP, Nathan Hartono, which consists of 5 tracks, was a departure from his usual jazz work, exploring acoustic pop and folk style In December 2012, he released a Christmas single titled, I'll Be Home For Christmas and also recorded a track titled, "Layu Sebelum Berkembang" for the official soundtrack of Indonesian feature film Langit Ke 7.

On June 30, 2013, Nathan released an original single on his official YouTube channel titled, Thinkin Bout Love, which is only available digitally. In 2015, he released his second Indonesian single, Pasti Ada Jawabnya, three years after his first Indonesian album.

On 16 June 2016, Nathan acted in a web series drama called Can You Not?! produced by YouTube channel TreePotatoes. It was a 10 episode web drama. Beth (Janice Chiang) is an ambitious, cutthroat producer. Jason (Benjamin Kheng) is a brilliant, but cocky director. Dave (Nathan Hartono) is a charming, handsome gentleman who happens to be their client. Put them together, toss in a high-stakes corporate film project and you get a recipe for mayhem!.

2016-2017: Sing! China and CPCLL Ambassador
In 2016, Nathan's breakthrough showing at the first season of Sing! China made him more famous in Singapore as well as in other Mandarin-speaking countries. He had become the first Singaporean to pass the blind auditions (all three of Singapore's previous entries to the show's predecessor, The Voice of China, had failed to do so). Upon catching the attention of all four judges who participated in the show: Jay Chou, Wang Feng, Na Ying, and Harlem Yu, he selected Chou as his mentor.

Under Chou's tutelage, he then worked his way to becoming the first Singaporean to make it to the semi-finals of both this show and The Voice of China. There, he was given 47 votes from the judges and 333 votes from the audience miraculously, thus finishing first in the semi-finals and successfully advancing to the finals - again as the first Singaporean contestant to do so. By then, his opponents were Chinese nationals Xu Geyang, Jiang Dunhao, Yang Meina and Wang Chenrui, as well as teenager Jeryl Lee of Malaysia.

He finished second overall in the final round that took place on October 7 at the Beijing National Stadium, after singing a mashup of classic hits "Moonlight Under The City" and "Women's Flower". This result was, nevertheless, the best a Singaporean (and any contestant who is not a Chinese citizen) has done in the competition since it went global in 2014.

This was amid controversy over the media voting process at the end of the finals. While there was supposed to have been 81 judges, 92 votes were cast – 45 of which were for Hartono and the remaining 47 for eventual champion Jiang Dunhao. Notwithstanding, amid speculation among netizens that the contest was rigged, Hartono had expressed that he was not at all disappointed by the results.

He returned to Singapore on Oct 9 to fans who received him at Changi Airport. Subsequently, in January 2017, he was appointed as an ambassador for the committee to Promote Chinese Language Learning at an event graced by chairman and Parliamentary Secretary for Education Low Yen Ling, in recognition for his achievements and for his efforts to improve his Mandarin during the course of the programme, and will work with the committee to promote the learning of the Chinese language among Singapore students. He was also nominated for The Straits Times Singaporean of the Year award.

2018-present: Mandarin debut
In 2018, Hartono made his debut in the Chinese market by releasing a Mandarin-language version of his song "Electricity", which was released on February 7, 2018, in China, and February 9 elsewhere. Following that, later he released a Mandarin music video on February 12, 2018.

In the end of 2019, Hartono comeback under Warner Music China, with a mandarin single song "Dig Deep", releasing the music video on December 26, 2019. Hartono is currently working on a series of releases in both Mandarin and English due for release in 2020.

In 2020, Singapore's National Day Parade (NDP) theme song “Everything I Am” is performed by Hartono.

Personal life
In 2018, Hartono announced his long-distance relationship with Dutch-Korean singer Na-Young Jeon on Instagram.

Discography

Studio albums

EPs

Singles

Soundtracks

Soundtrack appearance

Filmography

Television series

Television shows

Films

Theatre

Other work
Aside from his work with the CPCLL, Nathan also takes part in the following:

In 2012, Nathan was the Ambassador of the Singaporean Eco Music Challenge. He was also the Opinion Leader (Music) of Puma Faas Beats Campaign 2012.

In 2017, Nathan was one of the Ambassadors, along with paralympian Theresa Goh and actor Ebi Shankara, of Pink Dot SG.

References

External links
 at Aquarius Musikindo
 at Music & Movement

1991 births
Living people
Singaporean people of Chinese descent
21st-century Singaporean male singers
Singaporean male stage actors
Singaporean television personalities
21st-century Singaporean male actors
Anglo-Chinese Junior College alumni
Singaporean Mandopop singers
Singaporean jazz musicians
Male jazz musicians